This is a list of the districts of Rwanda by population as of August 15, 2012, the date of the 2012 Rwanda population and housing census. Gasabo District of Kigali City is the most populous district with more than half a million people, while Nyarugenge of Kigali City is the least populous. This list compares the results from 2012 census with the results from 2002 when the last census was held.


Districts by population

See also 

 List of cities in Rwanda

References